is a former Japanese football player. His son Towa Yamane is also a footballer.

Playing career
Yamane was born in Hiroshima on July 31, 1976. After graduating from high school, he joined J1 League club Sanfrecce Hiroshima in 1995. He played many matches as offensive midfielder in 1997. However his opportunity to play decreased in 1998. In November 1998, he moved to Japan Football League club Oita Trinity (later Oita Trinita). The club was promoted to J2 League from 1999. He also became a regular player as defensive midfielder under manager Nobuhiro Ishizaki. The club finished at 3rd place in 1999 and 2000, and missed promotion to J1 for 2 years in a row. In 2002, although Ishizaki already left the club, the club won the champions and was promoted to J1 from 2003. However he did not play in J1 from 2003, and moved to J2 club Kawasaki Frontale which Ishizaki managed in 2003. In 2003, the club finished at 3rd place and missed promotion to J1 and Ishizaki left the club. In 2004, the club won the champions and was promoted to J1 from 2005. However he could hardly play in the match from 2004 and he left the club end of 2005 season. In 2006, he moved to J2 club Kashiwa Reysol by inviting Ishizaki. He played as regular player under manager Ishizaki and the club was promoted to J1 form 2007. From 2008, although his opportunity to play decreased, the club won the 2nd place 2008 Emperor's Cup. In 2010, he moved to newly was promoted to Japan Football League club, Zweigen Kanazawa. He retired end of 2011 season.

Club statistics

References

External links

1976 births
Living people
Association football people from Hiroshima Prefecture
Japanese footballers
J1 League players
J2 League players
Japan Football League (1992–1998) players
Japan Football League players
Sanfrecce Hiroshima players
Oita Trinita players
Kawasaki Frontale players
Kashiwa Reysol players
Zweigen Kanazawa players
Association football midfielders